Vojni Dol (in older sources Voljedol or Volovji Dol) is a former settlement in the Municipality of Moravče in central Slovenia. It is now part of the village of Podgorica pri Pečah. The area is part of the traditional region of Upper Carniola. The municipality is now included in the Central Slovenia Statistical Region.

Geography
Vojni Dol lies in the eastern part of Podgorica pri Pečah, north of the main road from Moravče to Mlinše.

History
Vojni Dol had a population of 33 living in five houses in 1880, and 49 living in eight houses in 1900. Vojni Dol was annexed by Podgorica pri Pečah in 1955, ending its existence as an independent settlement.

References

External links

Vojni Dol on Geopedia

Populated places in the Municipality of Moravče
Former settlements in Slovenia